Kalshali (Kälşäle) is a rural locality (a selo) in Karamaly-Gubeyevsky Selsoviet, Tuymazinsky District, Bashkortostan, Russia. The population was 525 as of 2010. There are 6 streets.

Geography 
Kalshali is located 44 km southeast of Tuymazy (the district's administrative centre) by road. Metevtamak is the nearest rural locality.

References 

Rural localities in Tuymazinsky District